Appias melania, the grey albatross, is a butterfly of the family Pieridae. It is endemic to northern Queensland in Australia.

The wingspan is about 50 mm.

The larvae feed on Drypetes species.

References

External links 
 Australian Faunal Directory
 Butterflies of Pieridae in Australia

Butterflies described in 1775
melania
Butterflies of Australia
Endemic fauna of Australia
Insects of Queensland
Taxa named by Johan Christian Fabricius